Iivar "Iivo" Väänänen (17 September 1887 – 13 April 1959) was a Finnish sport shooter who competed in the 1912 Summer Olympics.

He was part of the Finnish team, which won the bronze medal in the 100 metre running deer, single shots event. He also competed in the 100 metre running deer, single shots event and finished 21st.

References

External links
profile

1887 births
1959 deaths
Finnish male sport shooters
Running target shooters
Shooters at the 1912 Summer Olympics
Olympic shooters of Finland
Olympic bronze medalists for Finland
Olympic medalists in shooting
Medalists at the 1912 Summer Olympics